Cercle Sportif Makiso is a Congolese football club based in Kisangani, Tshopo province and currently playing in the Linafoot Ligue 2, the second level of the Congolese football.

External links
Club profile - Soccerway.com

Football clubs in the Democratic Republic of the Congo
Sports clubs in the Democratic Republic of the Congo
Kisangani